Erythrolamprus ornatus, also known commonly as the ornate ground snake and the Saint Lucia racer, is a species of snake in the family Colubridae. The species is native to the eastern Caribbean. It is the rarest snake on earth with fewer than 20 left in the wild.

Geographic range
E. ornatus is endemic to Saint Lucia, an island nation in the West Indies, in the eastern Caribbean Sea.

Habitat

Description
Its coloration is variable. Some individuals have a broad brown vertebral stripe. In others, the brown stripe is interrupted by alternating yellow spots.

Behavior
E. ornatus is probably diurnal.

Diet
E. ornatus preys on small rodents and lizards.

Reproduction
E. ornatus is oviparous.

Conservation status
In 1936, E. ornatus was declared extinct, but it was rediscovered in 1973. It disappeared again soon after, but 11 individuals were found in 2012 on the mongoose-free island of Maria Major off the coast of Vieux Fort, Saint Lucia.

References

Further reading
Garman S (1887). "On West Indian Reptiles in the Museum of Comparative Zoölogy, at Cambridge, Mass". Proceedings of the American Philosophical Society 24: 278–286. (Dromicus ornatus, new species, p. 281).
Grazziotin FG, Zaher H, Murphy RW, Scrocchi G, Benavides MA, Zhang Y-P, Bonatto SL (2012). "Molecular Phylogeny of the New World Dipsadidae (Serpentes: Colubroidea): a reappraisal". Cladistics 28 (5): 437–459. (Erythrolamprus ornatus, new combination, p. 457).
Parker HW (1936). "Some extinct Snakes of the West Indies". Annals and Magazine of Natural History, Tenth Series 18: 227–233.
Schwartz A, Henderson RW (1991). Amphibians & Reptiles of the West Indies: Descriptions, Distributions, and Natural History. Gainesville, Florida: University of Florida Press. 720 pp. . (Liophis ornatus, p. 625).
Smith HM, Dixon JR, Wallach V (1993). "Dromicus giganteus Jan (Reptilia: Serpentes) is a nomen nudum ". Bulletin of the Maryland Herpetological Society 29 (3): 77–79.
Williams RJ, Ross TN, Morton MN, Daltry JC, Isidore L (2016). "Update on the natural history and conservation status of the Saint Lucia racer, Erythrolamprus ornatus Garman, 1887 (Squamata: Dipsadidae)". Herpetology Notes 9: 157–162.

ornatus
Reptiles of Saint Lucia
Endemic fauna of Saint Lucia
Snakes of the Caribbean
Reptiles described in 1887
Taxa named by Samuel Garman
Taxonomy articles created by Polbot